12:01 is a 1993 American science fiction television film directed by Jack Sholder and starring Jonathan Silverman, Helen Slater, Jeremy Piven, and Martin Landau. It originally aired on the Fox Network in the United States on July 5, 1993.

It is an adaptation of Richard Lupoff's short story "12:01 PM," published in the December 1973 issue of The Magazine of Fantasy & Science Fiction. The story had previously been adapted into the 1990 short film 12:01 PM starring Kurtwood Smith.

Plot
Barry Thomas is bored with his job and moons over high-profile scientist Lisa Fredericks, who is working on a particle accelerator that accelerates faster than the speed of light, but is about to be shut down because of potential risks.

On the way home, Barry sees Lisa fatally shot and takes it very hard. While at home at midnight, he receives a strong electrical shock. The next morning the events of the previous day are repeating themselves and Barry is the only one who realizes that the world is stuck in a time loop. During several repetitions, Barry figures out how to save Lisa and get closer to her. His actions also get him fired and arrested for knowing too much about events.  Barry and Lisa eventually learn that her boss, Dr. Thadius Moxley, has been conducting illegal and unethical experiments with the faster-than-light particle accelerator in the hopes of harvesting its extreme cheap energy with the intention of earning a lot of money with it. These experiments caused the time loop. In fact, it was Lisa's partial knowledge of Dr. Moxley's illegal activities that resulted in her murder by his henchmen. After getting involved with an undercover government agent, they must stop her boss from starting his experiment at the end of a loop or the world will be trapped forever repeating the same day.

Expanding on the original's premise of a one-hour time loop, this version saw the main character reliving the same 24-hour period, which would restart at one minute past midnight (rather than midday as in the other versions). It also contains a happy ending, as the protagonist ultimately finds a way to correct the time loop over the course of the film’s 92-minute running time.

Cast
 Jonathan Silverman as Barry Thomas
 Helen Slater as Lisa Fredericks 
 Jeremy Piven as Howard Richter 
 Nicolas Surovy as Dr. Robert Denk
 Martin Landau as Dr. Thadius Moxley 
 Robin Bartlett as Anne Jackson
 Danny Trejo as Prisoner
 Constance Marie as Joan Zevo
 Glenn Morshower as Detective Cryers 
 Paxton Whitehead as Dr. Tiberius Scott 
 Cheryl Anderson as Supervisor
 Giuseppe Andrews as Kyle (as Joey Andrews)
 Frank Collison as Thin Assassin

Release
The film was released on DVD in the United States on November 28, 2006.

Legal action
The film Groundhog Day, which has a similar time loop premise, was also released in 1993. The writers and producers of 12:01 believed their work was stolen by Groundhog Day.

According to Richard Lupoff:
A brilliant young filmmaker named Jonathan Heap made a superb 30-minute version of my short story "12:01 PM". It was an Oscar nominee in 1990, and was later adapted (very loosely) into a two-hour Fox movie called 12:01. The story was also adapted—actually plagiarized—into a major theatrical film in 1993. Jonathan Heap and I were outraged and tried very hard to go after the rascals who had robbed us, but alas, the Hollywood establishment closed ranks. We were no Art Buchwald. After half a year of lawyers' conferences and emotional stress, we agreed to put the matter behind us and get on with our lives.

See also
 List of films featuring time loops

References

External links
 

1993 television films
1993 films
1993 science fiction films
1990s American films
1990s English-language films
American science fiction television films
Films based on American short stories
Films based on science fiction short stories
Films directed by Jack Sholder
Films set in 1993
Films set in California
Fox network original films
New Line Cinema films
Television films based on short fiction
Time loop films